ArenaNet, LLC is an American video game developer and subsidiary of NCsoft, founded in 2000 by Mike O'Brien, Patrick Wyatt and Jeff Strain and located in Bellevue, Washington. They are most notable as developers of the online role-playing game series Guild Wars.

History
The founders of ArenaNet were former employees of Blizzard Entertainment who played important roles in developing the video games Warcraft, Warcraft 2, StarCraft, Diablo, Diablo II, and the Battle.net gaming network. They left Blizzard in February 2000 to form their own company. Their new studio was briefly called Triforge, Inc. before changing its name to ArenaNet. The company was acquired by NCsoft in 2002. On September 10, 2008, NCsoft announced the formation of NCsoft West, headquartered in Seattle, Washington. ArenaNet founders Jeff Strain and Patrick Wyatt left ArenaNet to take roles at NCsoft West in 2008, and ultimately left NCsoft in 2009. In October 2019, the remaining founder, Mike O'Brien, announced his departure and founding of a new studio called ManaWorks.

Titles

Guild Wars

Guild Wars: Prophecies
Guild Wars, retroactively called Guild Wars: Prophecies, is the first in the Guild Wars series. It is an action role-playing game, with competition in both the player versus player (in random matches, teams, tournaments, or guild battles), and player versus environment (in missions, quests, or area exploration) forms. The developers call this blend a "competitive online role-playing game". Important goals of the game are both to minimize the amount of repetitive actions a player has to perform to become a respectable force in the gaming world (called grind), and also to minimize a player's dependency on game items to stay competitive. These are two goals that set the game apart from most massively online role-playing games (MMORPGs), where one hardcore player will gain major advantages when competing against another more casual gamer simply from having played the game more and found better items. In Guild Wars, the advantages in battle will instead come from how well a player picks and uses the character's 8 skills (from a library of hundreds), an art that is hard to master. The game is different from most MMORPGs in that it did not have any additional recurring fees, but bases revenue on standalone game expansions, or "campaigns" (in addition to microtransactions). This structure was discontinued with Eye of the North, which was a traditional expansion pack that required one of the three standalone campaigns. ArenaNet stated that this was because they felt that this format was restricting their ability to add new game mechanics and balance the overwhelming number of skills introduced with each title, and decided to begin work on Guild Wars 2 to address these issues (with Eye of the North bridging the gap between Guild Wars and Guild Wars 2).

Guild Wars: Factions
Guild Wars Factions is the first sequel to Guild Wars, and among other things adds a new world map with accompanying missions, two new professions (the Assassin and Ritualist),  several new gaming modes, and "titles" which measures the advance of characters in several tasks. It is sometimes referred to as the second "chapter", with the first one being the released game itself, but then with the label Guild Wars: Prophecies to make a distinction between the chapters. Be aware that this is not an expansion pack, but a stand-alone product, meaning that it does not require Guild Wars: Prophecies to play, although it enhances the player's gaming experience to have both titles.

Guild Wars: Nightfall
Guild Wars Nightfall, the third chapter in the Guild Wars saga, was released on October 27, 2006. As with the previous chapters, this is a stand-alone product, but it can be merged with the previous campaigns to enhance the gaming experience. This third chapter introduces a new world map, two new professions (the Dervish and Paragon), a new PvP mode, but its most remarkable new feature is the introduction of "Heroes" who travel with the character between missions and campaigns and are fully customizable by the player.

Guild Wars: Eye of the North
Eye of the North is the first true expansion pack in the Guild Wars series. Released on August 31, 2007, it requires one of three earlier full campaigns, and introduces two new races—the Asura and the Norn—that will be playable in the upcoming Guild Wars 2. It is intended to bridge the gap to Guild Wars 2 by means of a Hall of Monuments, a mechanism that allows transferring achievements in the original series to the sequel.

Guild Wars: Beyond
In an effort to resolve plot threads, ArenaNet has released a series of "mini-expansion" updates, collectively known as Guild Wars Beyond. This series of storylines and events in Guild Wars helps set the stage for Guild Wars 2, which takes place 250 years in the future. Guild Wars Beyond begins with War in Kryta, then Hearts of the North, and continues with Winds of Change. After the Guild Wars 2 release, ArenaNet formally announced that they "will no longer release any new content". Some of these scrapped Beyond-updates included: the Ebon Vanguards' withdrawal and establishment of Ebonhawke; the Lunatic Court and their attempts to free Mad King Thorn; expanding on the story of Palawa Joko and continue that plot thread, which was left dangling in Nightfall; and the disappearance of Evennia, last seen in Old Ascalon during the Krytan civil war.

Guild Wars 2
Announced in March 2007, Guild Wars 2 is the sequel to the current Guild Wars series of games. The game is set around 250 years after the events in the original series and contains several new features, consisting of a more persistent world (as opposed to mostly instanced), dynamic questing, a personal branching storyline, and an updated graphics engine. On the morning of August 20, 2009, ArenaNet released the first trailer for Guild Wars 2 on their website. Closed in-house beta testing started in December 2011 and press beta weekend events started being rolled out in March 2012. Beta weekend events began in April 2012 and were open to those who pre-purchased the game, those who received an invite by signing up and those who obtained a beta key from a giveaway. On June 28, 2012, ArenaNet announced that Guild Wars 2 would be released on August 28, 2012; meanwhile, people who pre-purchased the game received a three-day headstart and began playing three days earlier, on August 25, 2012.  In its first 2 weeks of sales Guild Wars 2 sold over 2 million copies.

After the release of Guild Wars 2 Arenanet initially spent their time fixing issues with the game; such as bugs and connection problems. Once the game had become stable, they set their focus on further improving Guild Wars 2 and evolving the concept of a 'living world', by adding both temporary and permanent content in biweekly updates. Along with these updates were seasonal and holiday events.

Guild Wars 2: Living World Seasons 1 and 2
ArenaNet's "Living World" concept was meant to maintain an appearance of a rapidly evolving and continuously changing game world. After the launch of the base game, biweekly patches of varying size and scope brought new content into the game, continuing for nearly two years until the spring of 2014. This content was not designed to be repeatable, with the added content only being accessible until the next living world patch. The content is now mostly inaccessible, though some instanced content and permanent changes to the game world remain. As the story content of these patches is no longer playable, a cinematic has been created to convey its story to new players. One of the most notable changes brought by this series of patches was the destruction of Lion's Arch, one of the game's major cities. The old version of the city can still be seen in base game personal story instances, which take place before the city's destruction.

The lack of permanence and repeatability of the content brought by Living World led ArenaNet to change its approach in the summer of 2014, launching a new series of patches which introduced new maps to the game world, as well as repeatable story instances similar to those included in the base game. Patches before this change were retroactively rebranded as "Season 1" of the Living World, while the new series was referred to as "Season 2". While Season 1 brought biweekly patches that ranged wildly in size, Season 2 brought a more focused and consistent set of eight patches between March 2014 and January 2015, bridging the story between Season 1 and the Heart of Thorns expansion. Season 2's format of larger releases were referred to as "episodes" in keeping with the television metaphor of "seasons".

Guild Wars 2: Heart of Thorns and Season 3
Guild Wars 2: Heart of Thorns was the first expansion pack for Guild Wars 2, released on October 23, 2015. Heart of Thorns introduced the Revenant profession to the game, four new open world maps with three distinct biomes, 10-man instanced raids, the mastery system, "elite specializations" for each of the game's now nine professions that substantially change the way they play, the new 'Stronghold' player-versus-player game format, and a new borderland map for the World versus World game mode.

Players who owned the Heart of Thorns expansion were also provided with access to a set of six living world patches released between July 2016 to July 2017, referred to as Season 3 of the Living World. The size of Living World patches grew with this season, as each patch introduced a large new explorable map, new masteries, and repeatable story instances. Season 3 aimed to deliver patches of the same size every 2–3 months by using three rotating teams of developers, each given six to nine months to create each release. It also included some smaller patches with minor changes and events in the spirit of Season 1, which were handled by a separate "current events" team.

Guild Wars 2: Path of Fire and Season 4
Guild Wars 2: Path of Fire is the second expansion pack for Guild Wars 2, released on September 22, 2017. Path of Fire introduces mounts, new open world maps in Elona (the same setting as Guild Wars: Nightfall), new 10-man raids, and another elite specialization for each of the game's professions.

As with Heart of Thorns, players who own the Path of Fire expansion have been given access to a series of post-expansion story patches with Season 4 of the Living World. While the size and quality of Living World releases increased over Season 4, with the developers expressing a desire to deliver "expansion level stories and features" through Living World patches, the frequency of updates suffered over Season 4, which was marked by repeated delays of episodes. While Season 3 released episodes every two to three months, several episodes in Season 4 have had as much as four months between major story releases. Season 4 consisted of six episodes released between November 2017 and May 2019. During Season 4, the "current events" team updated several festivals that had not been seen since Season 1 and reintroduced them as repeating, yearly events.

The game was nominated for the "Outstanding Video Game" GLAAD Media Award.

Guild Wars 2: The Icebrood Saga
Announced on August 30, 2019, at an event held by ArenaNet, "The Icebrood Saga" is a continuation of the Living World format of content releases, and had previously been referred to by ArenaNet as "Season 5" of the Living World. While previous Living World seasons have bookended expansions, the Icebrood Saga follows directly from Season 4. Like Season 4, it is only available to players who own the Path of Fire expansion.

Guild Wars 2: End of Dragons 
Announced on August 25, 2020, Guild Wars 2: End of Dragons is the third expansion pack for Guild Wars 2. Originally slated for a 2021 release date, it was later pushed back to an estimated release date of early 2022. The expansion was previously teased to fans on March 12, 2020, when the developers confirmed the games return to the realm of Cantha, something fans had long requested. The official announcement was accompanied by a cinematic teaser showing off the new area the game would feature. A developer livestream was held on July 27, 2021, which showcased prominent features like the addition of fishing to the game. The expansion was released February 28, 2022.

Controversies
On July 5, 2018, founder Mike O'Brien announced that two game developers, Jessica Price and Peter Fries, had been fired from the company for "[failing] to uphold [their] standards of communicating with players" by attacking community members on Twitter. The decision to fire the developers led to a mixed reaction from fans and others inside the industry. O'Brien stood by the decision to release the two developers, citing that their actions had occurred when they were representing themselves and their opinions as the opinions of the company, and that alienating customers was unacceptable, thus necessitating termination of their employment, though he considered the firing to be 'regrettable' due to the fact that both had made favorable contributions to the company.

Nathan Grayson, for Kotaku, and Megan Farokhmanesh, for The Verge, reported that there was an uptick in online harassment of female developers after Price's firing and that backlash to Price originated in Gamergate forums. Farokhmanesh wrote that "ArenaNet’s swift action to fire both Price and Fries sends a disturbing message to its fans, and especially its most toxic ones: that their power is directly correlated to how loud they yell. It’s a worrying precedent for anyone interested in working for ArenaNet, but especially those in marginalized communities that are more likely to face blowback and harassment from the worst parts of its fanbase".

Both PC Gamer and Polygon included this event on their respective 2018 gaming controversies lists.

References

External links
 

American subsidiaries of foreign companies
Companies based in Bellevue, Washington
Guild Wars
Video game companies of the United States
Video game development companies
NCSoft
American companies established in 2000
Video game companies established in 2000
2002 mergers and acquisitions